Akashic Books is a Brooklyn-based independent publisher. Akashic Books' collection began with Arthur Nersesian's The Fuck Up  in 1997, and has since expanded to include Dennis Cooper's "Little House on the Bowery" series, Chris Abani's Black Goat poetry series, and the internationally successful "Noir" series, originating with Brooklyn Noir, since expanding to international titles such as "Delhi Noir" and "Havana Noir."

Akashic Books authors include T Cooper, Ron Kovic, Derek McCormack, Melvin Van Peebles, Ryan Adams, Lydia Lunch, Richard Hell, Nina Revoyr, Les Claypool, Pete Hamill, Carlos Pintado, Lawrence Block, Travis Jeppesen, James Greer, Joe Meno, Elizabeth Nunez, Adam Mansbach, and Greg Prato.

In June 2011, Akashic published the widely successful Go the Fuck to Sleep by Adam Mansbach. Go the Fuck to Sleep was subject to an unintended viral marketing campaign after PDF copies of the book, presumably from advance copies sent to booksellers, were distributed via email. While the book was originally scheduled for release in October 2011, by the end of April the book had hit #2 on Amazon.com's bestseller list, and by May 12 the book was #1. In the meantime, the publishing date was moved up to June, and Akashic increased its first printing to 150,000 copies. Akashic, which acknowledged the importance of social media in popularizing the book ("it's a miracle from the heavens for us"), is trying to prevent unauthorized copying of the book.

Akashic Books was started by Johnny Temple, former bassist of Girls Against Boys and mid-80s Dischord band Soulside,  with the mission "to make literature more part of popular culture, not just a part of elitist culture."

The publishing house is currently run out of the (OA) Can Factory in Brooklyn.

References

External links
Official site

Small press publishing companies
Book publishing companies based in New York City
Publishing companies established in 1996
Companies based in Brooklyn
1996 establishments in New York City